Margareta Mađerić (born 2 July 1977) is a Croatian politician who serves as a member of the Croatian Democratic Union in the Croatian Parliament. Prior to her political career, she served as a marketing and communications manager.

Political career 
Mađerić entered politics in 1997 at age 15 as an activist for the HDZ Youth. She served as president of the HDZ Youth from 2002 to 2007, which due to its position internally within the party, also made her one of the internal presidents of the Croatian Democratic Union.

Member of the Zagreb City Assembly 
In 2005, Mađerić was elected to the Zagreb Assembly, where she served three terms. Between 2010 and 2013, she was the leader of the HDZ  group within the Assembly. According to 2012 Assembly statistics, Mađerić was the second-most active member of the Assembly after Morane Paliković Gruden (HNS).

In addition to her duties in the Zagreb Assembly, Mađerić remained a local HDZ political organizer, and the president of the Katarina Zrinski Women's Association. In the 2013 Mayoral elections in Zagreb, she ran as the HDZ candidate for mayor.

Member of Parliament 
In the 2015 Croatian parliamentary election, Mađerić ran as a candidate for the Patriotic Coalition, led by the HDZ.  She was elected in the 1st Constituency and when Parliament resumed, Mađerić was named to the Mandate and Immunity Committee in Parliament.

Personal life 
Mađerić is married with two children.

References

External links 
 Biography from the Zagreb Assembly. http://www.zagreb.hr/default.aspx?id=80 
 Official Website http://www.margareta-madjeric.hr 

Croatian Democratic Union politicians
Representatives in the modern Croatian Parliament
21st-century Croatian women politicians
21st-century Croatian politicians
1977 births
Living people
Politicians from Zagreb